Elsa Margarida Meira Ventura is a Portuguese football midfielder currently playing for Sporting CP. She made her Champions League debut in August 2012, scoring against Glentoran LFC. She played then for SU 1º Dezembro.

A former Under-19 international, she was called up by the senior Portuguese national team for the first time in March 2012 replacing Edite Fernandes.

References

1990 births
Living people
People from Portalegre, Portugal
Portuguese women's footballers
Portugal women's international footballers
Women's association football midfielders
Campeonato Nacional de Futebol Feminino players
Sporting CP (women's football) players
S.U. 1º Dezembro (women) players
C.F. Benfica (women) footballers
Sportspeople from Portalegre District